Wittrock is a surname of North German origin. People with the surname include:

 Finn Wittrock (born 1984), American actor and screenwriter
 Merlin Wittrock (1931–2007), American educational psychologist
 Veit Brecher Wittrock (1839–1914), Swedish botanist

Surnames of German origin